Kaseh Garan or Kaseh-ye Geran or Kasehgaran may refer to:
 Kaseh Garan, Kermanshah
 Kasehgaran, West Azerbaijan